Subarnapur district or Sonepur district of Odisha is a part of Kalahandi Balangir Koraput region. This district does not have any universities and postgraduate level educational institution. In addition, there are no medical and engineering colleges in Subarnapur district. Following are the colleges, high schools, primary schools and Saraswati vidyamandir present in Subarnapur district. According to recent report there are 654 primary schools, 212 ME schools, 100 high schools and 8 colleges in Subarnapur district.

Colleges
 Sonepur College
 PS College, Ulunda
 Birmaharajpur College
 Dunguripali College, Dunguripali
 Subalaya College, Subalaya
 A.E.S.College, Tarbha, Tarbha
 Sidhartha College, Binka
 Dharmasala College, Dharmasala
 Bhutiapali College, Bhutiapali
 Biju Pattnaik Women's College, Sonepur
 Bal Gangadhar Tilak Law College, Sonepur
 Binka women's college, Phulmuti, Binka
 M.B.R College, Menda
 Maa Maheshwari college, Kham
 Kingpin Institute of Hotel Management, Sonepur

High schools
 Anchalik Uchha Vidya Pitha, Kenjhiriapali
 Panchayat High School, Narayanpur
 Maharaja High School, Sonepur
 Birmaharajpur Boy's High School
 Ulunda High School, Ulunda
 Dharmasala High School, Dharmasala
 Subalaya High School, Subalaya
 Kamira High School
 Jatesinga High School
 Jay Jagannath High School, Sialjuli
 AMARPALI HIGH SCHOOL, AMARPALI (WITH SCHOOL HOSTEL)
 Panchayat High School, Nimna 
 Sri Ganesh High School, Pachamahala

External links
 Subarnapur district report